The Guinea Pig is a three-act play by Warren Chetham-Strode. The work premiered in London's West End at the Criterion Theatre in 1946, starring Rachel Gurney as Lynne Hartley. Following its successful sixteen month run, the play was adapted into a 1948 film, starring Richard Attenborough and Sheila Sim.

Original West End cast
Dennis Stringer, M.A. – William Mervyn
Fitch – George Bryden
Grimmett – Denholm Elliott
Knox –	Roger Braban
lloyd Hartley, M.A. –	Cecil Trouncer
Lynne Hartley – Rachel Gurney
Mr Read – Duncan Lewis
Mrs Read – Joan Hickson
Mrs. Hartley – Edith Sharpe
Nigel Lorraine, B.A. – Robert Flemyng
Read –	Derek Blomfield

References

1946 plays
British plays adapted into films
West End plays
Plays set in the United Kingdom
Plays by Warren Chetham-Strode